Kerlingarfjöll is a  tall mountain range in Iceland situated in the Highlands of Iceland near the Kjölur highland road. The volcanic origin of these mountains is evidenced by the numerous hot springs and rivulets in the area, as well as red volcanic rhyolite stone of which the mountains are composed. Minerals that have emerged from the hot springs also color the ground yellow, red and green.

The area was known formerly for its summer ski resort, but this was dismantled in 2000. Since 2000, Kerlingarfjöll has been operated as a highland resort, offering accommodation and food services to guests in the area.

On March 17 in 2017 the Iceland Monitor stated that the Kerlingarfjöll Mountains and geothermal area were being turned into a nature reserve. Although parts of the place already had protection, the whole 367 square kilometres are to be under the protection of the state of Iceland. There have been thoughts of using the 140 degree Celsius hot springs as a geothermal power plant. The area is popular with hiking and the tourists.

There are various half-day and one-day hiking trails in the area.

See also
 Geography of Iceland
 Iceland plume
 Volcanism of Iceland
Loðmundur, a mountain in Kerlingafjöll

References

External links

 Hiking routes in Kerlingarfjoll
 Description and links to hiking tours

Mountains of Iceland
Defunct ski areas and resorts
Tuyas of Iceland
Mid-Iceland Belt
One-thousanders of Iceland